Hannele Chiguridaga is a 1968 Indian Kannada-language film directed by M. R. Vittal and produced by Srikanth Enterprises. The film stars Rajkumar, R. Nagendra Rao and Kalpana. The film is based on the novel of the same name by Triveni and deals with the empowerment of women in education and also issues around widow marriage.

The original score and soundtrack were composed by M. Ranga Rao and had lyrics written by R. N. Jayagopal. The film won several awards after release including the Karnataka State Film Award for First Best Film.

Cast
 R. Nagendra Rao as Anantha Rao
 Rajkumar as Prasad
 Kalpana as Malathi
 Arun Kumar as Shivanand
 Dinesh as Keshava
 Ranga as Madhava
 B. V. Radha
 M. Jayashree as Raji
 Papamma
 Pradhan
 Vijaykumar
 Indira George
 Baby Rani as Manju
 Premalatha as Jayanthi, a stage actress

Soundtrack

The soundtrack music was composed by M. Ranga Rao, and lyrics written by R. N. Jayagopal. The album has six tracks.

Awards
1968–69 Karnataka State Film Awards
 First Best Film
 Best Actor – R. Nagendra Rao
 Best Actress – Kalpana
 Best Music Director – M. Ranga Rao
 Best Story Writer – Triveni

References

External links
 

1968 films
1960s Kannada-language films
Indian black-and-white films
Films scored by M. Ranga Rao
Films based on Indian novels
Films directed by M. R. Vittal
Films about widowhood in India
Films about women in India
Widowhood in India